The 1915 Ottawa Rough Riders finished in 3rd place in the Interprovincial Rugby Football Union with a 2–3 record and failed to qualify for the playoffs.

Regular season

Standings

Schedule

(*) The November 6 game won by Toronto over Ottawa was called because of darkness and protested by Ottawa. IRFU executives upheld the protest and declared the game no-contest.

References

Ottawa Rough Riders seasons